The Dagons mix fuzzy guitars, pounding drums & haunting vocals with dreamy lyrics referencing fairy tales & mythology to create their distinctive sound.  They are a two-piece band from Los Angeles, made up of Karie Jacobson (guitar, vocals) and Drew Kowalski (drum set and sitar).

The Dagons have “a unique, otherworldly feel which adds a sprawling, surreal quality to the genre of indie rock”  
and for their distinctive juxtapositions of contrasting elements, such as the short, stripped-down song forms of punk with dark, otherworldly psychedelia, or the contrast of fuzzy guitars and pounding drums with minor key melodies and dreamy vocals. Also unusual is the group's use of distorted electrified sitar, played by The Dagons drummer and producer Drew Kowalski.

Several sources state that the band's name, The Dagons (pronounced Day-gons) is a reference to Dagon, the half-man, half-fish god of the Mediterranean sea. Other sources claim that the band's name is a reference to the being Father Dagon as described by horror-fantasy writer H.P. Lovecraft.

History 

The Dagons, formed by Karie Jacobson and Drew Kowalski, began playing shows in the late 1990s. Lorraine Rath joined the band on bass in 1998, and plays on the band's first full-length album The Other Ending (1999, Dead Sea Captain Records).   
   
In 2000, the Dagons again became a two-piece band composed of Jacobson and Kowalski, who are a real-life couple. The two moved to Los Angeles, and released the album Make Us Old (2000, Dead Sea Captain.) Make Us Old was the first Dagons album to be produced by drummer Drew Kowalski.

In 2003, The Dagons released the album Teeth for Pearls (2003, Dead Sea Captain).

The Dagons fourth album, Reverse, was released in 2006 on the Montreal label Blow The Fuse. In 2007 Reverse was re-released in Europe. There are two official videos from The Dagons "Reverse" for the songs In Gingham and It Flies Out. Three more official videos for "Upon The Dull Earth" (2011) have been released, and one from the upcoming album, "Witches' Animals."

"Witches' Animals," The Dagons' sixth album, was released in October 2015.

Discography

Albums and singles
Witches' Animals (2015, Dead Sea Captain)
Upon The Dull Earth (2011, Dead Sea Captain) 
The Zero Years (digital single, 2007)
Reverse (2006, Dead Sea Captain, 2006, Blow the Fuse, 2007 Griptape)
Teeth For Pearls (2003, Dead Sea Captain)
Make Us Old (2000, Dead Sea Captain)
The Other Ending (1999, Dead Sea Captain)

Compilations
Unquiet Grave, The Ultimate Goth Collection] (Sept.2008, Cleopatra Records)
Abus Dangereux compilation (Abus Dangereux)
"M For Montreal" M For Montreal  
Unquiet Grave Vol. 4 (2004, Cleopatra Records)
1999 "San Francisco 1999" - Revenge Records

Film and TV 
The House of Seven Gables (2018, Ben Wickey)
FML (2016, Avalon Television)
Awkward. (2012, MTV -Season 2 Episode 9) 
Degrassi (2011, Season 11 Episode 13) 
Roman (2007, Echo Bridge Entertainment, starring Kristen Bell, Lucky McKee, dir. Angela Bettis)
When is Tomorrow  (2007, Mo-Freek, starring Eddie Steeples)

References

External links
The Dagons at All Music
The Dagons Bandcamp

American post-punk music groups
Musical groups established in 1999
Musical groups from Los Angeles
1999 establishments in California